The Victorian Community History Awards are held annually to recognise the contributions made by Victorians in the preservation of the State's history, and to recognise excellence in historical research. The effect of the VCHA over the period from 1998 to the present has been the stimulation of community history, the lifting of standards and the fostering of diversity and originality.

History
The Victorian Community History Awards were established and sponsored in 1997 by  Information Victoria. The judges have always been appointed by the Royal Historical Society of Victoria, and among the first were Professor Weston Bate, Professor A. G. L. Shaw, and senior journalist at The Age, John Lahey.

Funding was suspended in 2006 to provide additional funds for the Commonwealth Games in Melbourne.  After 2010 Information Victoria Bookshop withdrew support for the program, but after a vigorous campaign by the RHSV for the continuance of the Awards, the Baillieu government accepted a submission from the Public Record Office Victoria (PROV) to continue the program for a further four-year period.

From 2011 the Awards were administered by the RHSV in partnership with PROV.

In 2012, following consultation between the Public Record Office Victoria and the Royal Historical Society of Victoria, award categories were slightly altered and renamed, as below:

Victorian Community History Awards, from 2012

Victorian Premier's History Award 
 2021: Alec Morgan, Tiriki Onus and Tom Zubrycki for Ablaze – A Feature Documentary
2020:  Amanda Scardamaglia for  Printed on Stone: The lithographs of Charles Troedel
2019: Phil Roberts for Avenue of Memories
 2018: Jill Giese for The Maddest Place on Earth
 2017: John Burch for Returning the Kulkyne
 2016: Pam Baragwanath and Ken James for These Walls Speak Volumes. A History of Mechanics' Institutes in Victoria
 2015: Meredith Fletcher for Jean Galbraith: writer in a valley
 2014: Anne Vale for Exceptional Australian Garden Makers
 2013: Robin A Vowels for Victoria’s Iron Lacework The Founders, Part A
 2012: Maree Coote for The Art of being Melbourne

History Publication Award
 2021: Michael McCarthy for In the Shadow of the Prom
2020: Brian Rhule for Maldon: A New History 1853-1928
2019: Carolyn Rasmussen for The Blackburns: Private lives, public ambition
 2018: Gregory C. Eccleston for Granville Stapylton: Australia Felix 1836, Second in Command to Major Mitchell
 2017: John Barnes for La Trobe. Traveller, Writer, Governor
 2016: Rozzi Bazzani for Hector: the story of Hector Crawford and Crawford Productions
 2015: Lucy Sussex for Blockbuster! Fergus Hume & the mystery of the hansom cab
 2014: Robert Kenny for Gardens of Fire: an investigative memoir
 2013: Olwen Ford for Harvester City: the making of multicultural Sunshine 1939–1975
 2012: Paul Strangio for Neither Power Nor Glory: 100 Years of political Labor in Victoria, 1856–1956

Special awards
 2021: Paul Paffen for For the Fallen: The 1921-1922 Melbourne Public Library Mural Competition within the setting of Decorative Painting in Australian Art
2021: Richard Broinowski for Under the Rainbow: The Life and Times of EW Cole
2020: Nick Anchen for Visions of Victoria: The Magic of Kodachrome Film 1950–1975
2019: Chloe Hooper for The Arsonist: A Mind on Fire and David Sornig for Blue Lake: Finding Dudley Flats and the West Melbourne swamp
 2018: Jennifer Bantow and Ros Lewis for Barro-abil Our Beautiful Barrabool Stone: History and Use of Barrabool Sandstone
 2017: Michael Morrison and Lisa Clausen for Cruden Farm Garden Diaries
 2016: Magda Szubanski for Reckoning: A Memoir
 2015: Graeme Davison for Lost Relations: fortunes of my family in Australia's Golden Age
 2014: Mornington Peninsula Local History Network and Lavender Hill Multimedia for Postcards: Stories from the Mornington Peninsula (DVD)
 2013: Judges' Special Prize for Excellence - Rod Charles for A Whirr of Many Wheels. Cycling in Geelong: A chronicle from 1869 to 1980 Volume 1: 1869 to 1914 
 2012: Judges' Special Prize for Excellence - Lorne Historical Society & Lorne Aireys Inlet P-12 College VCAL Students for Construction of The Great Ocean Road DVD

Oral History Award (from 2019)
 2021: Lynda Mitchelson-Twigg, representing the Gippsland Lakes Commercial Fishing Community, assisted by Nikki Henningham, Leigh Henningham, Tanya King, Donna Squire and Geoff Stanton for End of an Era: The Last Gippsland Lakes Fishermen
2020: Sandy Jeffs and Margaret Leggatt for Out of the Madhouse: From Asylums to Caring Community?
 2019: Peg Fraser for Black Saturday

Local History – Small Publication Award
 2021: Sarah Pinto for Places of Reconciliation: Commemorating Indigenous History in the Heart of Melbourne
2020: Benjamin Wilkie for Gariwerd: An Environmental History of the Grampians
2019: Beris Campbell et al. for More Than Just Housing: The South Port Community Housing Group Story 1983–2018
 2018: Hans-Wolter von Gruenewaldt and Kay Ball for Art Captured: Hans-Wolter von Gruenewaldt, Prisoner of War Camp 13 Murchison: His Story and His Art
 2017: Robyn Lewis for Building Castlemaine: The Red Brick Legacy of H.D. McBean
 2016: Judith Buckrich for The Village of Ripponlea
 2015: Fiona Poulton and Katherine Sheedy for Boroondara Remembers: stories of World War 1
 2014: Margaret Bowman for Cultured Colonists: George Alexander Gilbert and His Family, Settlers in Port Phillip
 2013: Coleen Bower for Water Races and Tin Mines of the Toora District: A Short History of the Tin Mines at Granite Bar and Toora
 2012: Ken McKimmie for Chewton Then and Now: A series of studies investigating change over time in the former Mount Alexander Goldfield town of Forest Creek later known as Chewton

Local History Project Award
 2021: Chinese Australian Family Historians of Victoria for Victorian CEDT Index
2020: Patrick Ferry with Wally Nye for Blood, Toil, Tears & Sweat: Remembering the Pakenham District’s WW2 Service Personnel, 1939–1945
2019: Jill A'Vard and Armin Richter for When Roads Were Tracks: A history of the roads of Monbulk, Kallista, the Patch and Sherbrooke
 2018: Elizabeth O’Callaghan for Silent Lives: Women of Warrnambool and District 1840-1910
 2017: Collingwood Historical Society for Notable People of Collingwood
 2016: Ian D. Clark (historian) for We Are All of One Blood: a History of the Djabwurrung Aboriginal People of Western Victoria, 1836-1901
 2015: Gillian and John Francis for Strewth! An insight into local involvement in World War One, 2 volumes
 2014: Marguerita Stephens (et al. for Vol 4) for The Journal of William Thomas, Assistant Protector of the Aborigines of Port Phillip & Guardian of the Aborigines of Victoria, 1839-1867, 4 volumes
 2013: Kevin O’Reilly for Flyers of Time: Pioneer Aviation in Country Victoria, The First Fifty Years. A Collection 
 2012: Mick Woiwod for Coranderrk Database

Collaborative Community History Award
 2021: Graham Willett, Angela Bailey, Timothy W Jones & Sarah Rood for A History of LGBTIQ+ Victoria in 100 Places and Objects
2020:  Cheryl Threadgold for In the Name of Theatre: The History, Culture and Voices of Amateur Theatre in Victoria
2019: The Springthorpe Heritage Group for Mont Park to Springthorpe heritage project
 2018: John Andrews and Deborah Towns for "A Secondary Education for All?" A History of State Secondary Schooling in Victoria
 2017: Julie Eagles (project coordinator) for Fletcher Jones: Stories from our Community
 2016: Susan Blackburn (ed) for Breaking Out: Memories of Melbourne in the 1970s
 2015: Craig Cormick (ed) for Ned Kelly Under the Microscope: solving the forensic mystery of Ned Kelly's remains
 2014: Gerry Robinson and friends for From Apples....to Coffee, the first 90 years of the Heathmont shopping centre, 1923-2013
 2013: Maree Hanlon and Pam Herbert (editors) for Through Their Eyes: A Glimpse into the Lives of Women from Benalla & District 
 2012: Lyn Skillern and others for From Inkwell to Internet: a century of State Secondary Education in Leongatha

Multimedia History Award / Digital Storytelling Award
 2021: Atalanti Dionysus / Atalanti Films for A Miscarriage of Justice 
2020: Rachel Fensham and Andrew Fuhrmann for the Digital Studio at University of Melbourne and Digital Heritage Australia for La Mama: The Biggest Little Theatre in Australia 
2018: Mallacoota and District Historical Society for Secrets from the Mallacoota Bunker
 2017: Ros Stirling and Heritage Films for Joseph Reed and the Making of Marvellous Melbourne
 2016: Rural City of Wangaratta for We Remember: honouring the service and sacrifice of local veterans and the Wangaratta community during WW1 (website & DVD)
 2015: Port Melbourne Historical and Preservation Society for Postcards from Port: an audiovisual retrospective of Port Melbourne (DVD)
 2014: Lilydale & District Historical Society Inc for Gun Alley: the forgotten story of Lilydale's back streets 1880 to today (website)
 2013: Valerie Wilson for A Guide to Pioneer Graves in the Mornington Cemetery  Website: 
 2012: Friends of Wyperfeld for Wyperfeld 100: A traverse in time DVD

Historical Interpretation Award
 2021: Commonplace Productions (Bill Garner and Sue Gore) with Kacey Sinclair, Alice Garner, Pat Furze and the Band Friends of Wendy Cotton for Finding Fanny Finch
2020: Lucy Bracey and Gregory Mackay for Annie’s War: The Story of One Boroondara Family’s Wartime Experience
2018: A collaborative exhibition by the Wangaratta Historical Society, Wangaratta Art Gallery and Museums Australia (Victoria) Roving Curator Program for Wangaratta Stories
 2017: Discover Historic Kyneton for Discover Historic Kyneton: A Guide to Discovering Kyneton’s Historic Places and People
 2016: Eva de Jong-Duldig and filmmaker David Smith for Duldig Studio Documentaries. Volume 1: 4 documentaries
 2015: Meyer Eidelson for Melbourne Dreaming: a guide to important places of the past and present 
 2014: Friends of La Trobe's Cottage for The garden at la Trobe's Cottage, Kings Domain, Melbourne
 2013: Chewton Domain Society for The Monster Meeting, The Great Meeting of Diggers 4 pm, 15 December 1851 
 2012: Gib Wettenhall for Goldfields Track Walking Guide

History Article (Peer Reviewed)
 2021: Barbara Minchinton for The Rise and Fall of Lady Gillott in Melbourne’s Turn-of-the-Century Society
2020: Ruby Ekkel for "Woman’s Sphere Remodelled: A Spatial History of the Victorian Woman’s Christian Temperance Union 1887–1914" in the Victorian Historical Journal
2018: Nikita Vanderby for "The Happiest Time of My Life": Emotive Visitor Books and Early Mission Tourism to Victoria's Aboriginal Reserves
 2017: Miranda Francis for 'One Woman's Crèche is a Bureaucrat's Child-Minding Centre, "The Flat" at Footscray High School 1976-1986' in Provenance Journal.
 2016: James Kirby for 'Beyond Failure and Success: the Soldier Settlement on Ercildoune Road' in Provenance Journal
 2015: Alistair Thomson for 'Anzac Memories Revisited: trauma, memory and oral history' in Oral History Review, Vol 42 Issue 1, 2015

Cultural Diversity Award
 2021: Roy Henry Patterson and Jennifer Jones for On Taungurung Land: Sharing History and Culture
2020: Jen Rose, Well Chosen Words in partnership with The Boite for The Boite: History Through Music, Song and Story
2019: Jan McGuiness for La Nostra Storia: The story of Italians in Ballarat
 2018: Stella Dimadis, Medea Films for Migrant Stories
 2017: Adam Ricco, Lella Cariddi and Multicultural Arts Victoria for two documentary films, Reading the Wind and Afterwards  
 2016: Anne Doyle for Wadaddi Nabadda. Paths to Peace: voices of the Somali speaking community

Centenary of World War 1 Award (2015–2018) 
 2018: Grahame Thom and the Kilmore Historical Society for Lest We Forget: Southern Mitchell Shire Volunteers Who Served in World War One
 2017: Richard Travers for To Paint a War: The Lives of the Australian Artists Who Painted the Great War 1914-1918
 2016: Ballarat & District Genealogical Society Inc for Home Front Ballarat WW1 (website)
 2015: Helen Doyle for Suburbs at War: the Cities of Malvern and Prahran during the Great War

Young Historians Award (15–18 years) 
 2015: Discontinued
 2014: Not awarded
 2013: Not awarded
 2012: Chelsea Way for New Horizons: Post-War Migration to Australia

Victorian Community History Awards, 1998 to 2011

Victorian Community History Awards - Overall Winner
 2011: Gunditjmara people with Gib Wettenhall for The People of Budj Bim
 2010: Jenny Davies for Behind the Facade: Flinders Street more than just a Railway Station
 2009: Ken Oldis for The Chinawoman
 2008: Annette O'Donohue & Bev Hanson for Eaglehawk & District Pioneer Register Volume 6 - T-Z
 2007: Jillian Durance for Still Going Strong: The story of the Moyarra Honor Roll
 2005: Justin Corfield, Dorothy Wickham and Clare Gervasoni for The Eureka Encyclopaedia
 2004: Wandiligong Preservation Society Co-ordinated by Coral Bennett and Joy Kit for Oriental Crossing
 2003: Ann Synan for We Came With Nothing: Story of the West Sale Migrant Holding Centre
 2002: Gillian Upton for The George: St Kilda Life and Times 
 2001: Warik Lawrance for 1864 (CD ROM)
 2000: Daryl Tonkin and Carolyn Landon for Jackson's Track - A Memoir of a Dreamtime Place
 1999: Dr. Andrew Brown-May for Melbourne Street Life
 1998: Patrick Morgan for The Settling of Gippsland, A Regional History

Best Community Research, Registers and Records
 2011: Marie Hansen Fels for  'I succeeded Once': The Aboriginal Protectorate on the Mornington Peninsula, 1839-1840.
 2010: Susie Zada and Pam Jennings for Scots in Geelong and District to 1860
 2009: Karen T Collins, Collingwood Historical Society for  Bitter Roots, Sweet Fruit: A history of schools in Collingwood, Abbotsford and Clifton Hill
 2008: John McKay and Hamilton History Centre Inc for The Streets of Hamilton, Western Victoria Australia: a History of the People behind the Names
 2007: Port Melbourne Historical & Preservation Society for History of a Street Precinct
 2005: Graeme Massey for Gallipoli Heroes: A tribute to the men from Western Victoria who gave their lives for their country
 2004: Arthur Yong, North Eastern Melbourne Chinese Association for Chinese Settlement in Darebin
 2003: Graeme Massey (Warracknabeal Secondary College – History Department) for Fallen Heroes. Warracknabeal War Memorial
 2002: Dianne Carroll for Carroll Heritage Collection
 2001: Allan Willingham for Camperdown: A Heritage Study
 2000: Keith Clarke for Convicts of the Port Phillip District
 1999: Brendan Fitzgerald and Bayside Library Services for Sin on Disc

Best Collaborative / Community Work
 2011: Michael Collins and others for Our Boys at the Front: The Mornington Peninsula at War 1914-18 from the pages of the Peninsula Post.  (Book and DVD)
 2010: Yarra Valley Italian Cultural Group for Dreams from a Suitcase ('Sogni Dalla Valigia'): Recollections of Italian Settlers in the Yarra Valley
 2009: Christine Grayden, Phillip Island Conservation Society for An Island Worth Conserving: A History of the Phillip Island Conservation Society
 2008: Collingwood Historical Society Inc for Collingwood Plaques Project
 2007: Andrew Brown-May and Shurlee Swain (eds) for The Encyclopedia of Melbourne
 2005: Peter Yule (ed.) and the Carlton Residents Association Inc. for Carlton: A History
 2004: Elizabeth Huf for Courage, Patience and Persistence: 150 Years of German Settlement in Western Victoria
 2003: Jewish Museum of Australia (in association with Shalom Association) for From Russia with Hope: Australian Jews from Russia 1870-2002 (Exhibition)
 2002: South Port Day Links and Port Melbourne Historical Society for Linking Us Together
 2001: Sigrid Borke for In and Out of Port. Voices from the Port of Melbourne. An Oral History
 2000: City of Whittlesea for Oral History and Poster Exhibition Project
 1999: Jan Critchett for Untold Stories - Memories and Lives of Victorian Koories
  1998: Linda Barraclough for historical research and community work in Gippsland

Best Print / Publication - Commercial
 2011: Ron Hateley for The Victorian Bush: its 'original and natural' condition.

Best Print / Publication - Self or Community Publication
 2011 Anne Longmire for The Catalysts: Change and Continuity 1910-2010.

Best Print / Publication
In 2011 the Best Print / Publication category was divided into Best Commercial Publication and Best Self or Community Publication. See above.

 2010: Robin Grow for Melbourne Art Deco
 2009: Gary Presland for The Place for a Village: How nature has shaped the City of Melbourne
 2008: Barry Heard for The View from Connor's Hill
 2007: Richard Broome for Aboriginal Victorians: A History Since 1800
 2005: Barry Hill and the Borough of Queenscliffe for The Enduring Rip: A History of Queenscliffe
 2004: John Poynter for Mr Felton's Bequests
 2003: Vicki Fairfax for A Place Across the River. They Aspired to Create the Victorian Arts Centre
 2002: Carolyn Rasmussen for A Museum for the People
 2001: Adrian Jones for Follow the Gleam: A History of Essendon Primary School 1850-2000
 2000: Peter Yule for The Royal Children's Hospital A History of Faith, Science and Love
 1999: Janet McCalman for Sex and Suffering - Women's Health and a Women's Hospital
 1998: Phil Taylor for Karkarook: a Mallee Shire History

Best Walk / Tour
 2011: Peter Cuffley, Helen McBurney, Geoff Palmer & Janey Runci for Henry Handel Richardson in Maldon.
 2010: Karen McIntyre for Lake Bolac Heritage Walk
 2009: Wangaratta Regional Tourist Development Inc for Heritage Walk, Wangaratta
 2008: Bayside City Council for Bayside Architectural Trail
 2007: Ruth Gallant, Footscray Reference Group & Maribyrnong City Council for Footscray Trail: a guided walk through the historic central business district
 2005: Margaret Gardner and Val Heffernan, The Hamilton History Centre for Exploring Hamilton Walks
 2004: Don Chambers for Melbourne General Cemetery
 2003: Carmel Taig for Yarraville in 1901
 2002: Ross Bastiaan for The Kokoda Walk in the Dandenong Ranges National Park
 2001: Bayside City Council for Bayside Coastal Art Trail. Stage 3
 2000: Richard Peterson for Brimstone to Bunyip Churches of Collingwood, Clifton Hill and Abbotsford 1852-1999
 1999: Angela Taylor, Ron Hateley, Tarnya Kruger for The La Gerche Walking Track
 1998: Mary Ryllis Clark for Discover Historic Victoria

Best Exhibit or Multimedia
 2011: The Jewish Museum of Australia for  Mameloshn: How Yiddish made a home in Melbourne.

Best Audio-Visual / Multimedia
In 2011 Best Exhibit and Best Audio-Visual / Multimedia were combined as a category. See above.

 2010: Keith White & Will Twycross for Visions of Port Phillip: The Burrells of Arthur's Seat 1851-1925
 2009: Bendigo Chinese Association Museum Inc trading as Golden Dragon Museum for Creating a Community Museum
 2008: Malcolm McKinnon and The Victorian Country Football League for Football Stories from Country Victoria
 2007: Landsborough Festivals Inc for From Gold to Grapes: The Story of Landborough
 2005: The Euston/Robinvale Historical Society Inc for Happy Birthday Robinvale
 2004: James McCaughey, Red Finch Films for The First Eleven: The First Australian Cricket Tour of England (Video)
 2003: Lakes Entrance Family History Resource Centre for Casting the Net – Pioneer Fishing Families of the Gippsland Coast
 2002: Geoff Russell for Sir John Quick and Bendigo's ANA
 2001: Lilydale & District Historical Society for Melba - Australia's Greatest Daughter
 2000: Bronwyn Hughes (Author), Laki Sideris (Developer) and Tim Dolby (Producer) for Lights of our Past: Australian Stained Glass
 1999: Timothy Lee for Wally's Weddings/The Bush Smithy

Best Exhibit / Display
In 2011 Best Exhibit and Best Audio-Visual / Multimedia were combined as a category. See above.

 2010: Janine Rizzetti (Heidelberg Historical Society) for  An Invitation to the Ball
 2009: Port Melbourne Historical and Preservation Society for The Navy in Port Exhibition: A month of celebration for the centenary of the Great White Fleet visit
 2008: Robinvale Network House for Migration Memories - Robinvale
 2007: Victorian Jazz Archive Inc. for Jazz Spans the Decades – A History of Jazz in Victoria
 2005: David Williams for Harvests, Headlands & Halcyon Heritage
 2004: Jointly organised by the Warrnambool Art Gallery and the Warrnambool and District Historical Vehicle Club. Curated by Brenda O'Connor for Early Motoring in Warrnambool
 2003: Melbourne's Living Museum of the West for A Stone Upon A Stone: A Touring Exhibition about the History and Heritage of Dry Stone Walls
 2002: Laharum Hall Committee for Federation Mural: History of Laharum
 2001: Golden Dragon Museum, Bendigo for Showing Face
 2000: Tatura and District Australia Day 2000 Committee for Tatura Collage Columns
 1999: Jan Mitchell for Baywalk Bollards Project
 1998: Mr Russell Jack - Bendigo Golden Dragon Museum

Special awards
 2011: Judges' Special Prize for Excellence - Gregory Eccleston and others for Early Navigators of Bass Strait, 1770-1803. (Map)
 2010: Award to Celebrate 175th Melbourne Anniversary -  Bain Attwood for Possession: Batman's Treaty and the matter of history
 2009: Judges' Special Prize for Excellence  - Paul R Mullaly for Crime in the Port Phillip District 1835-51

See also

List of Australian literary awards
Australian History Awards
 New South Wales Premier's History Awards
Northern Territory History Awards
Prime Minister's Prize for Australian History
 List of history awards

Notes

References
  Victorian Community History Awards from 1998 Royal Historical Society of Victoria (Retrieved 21 January 2013)
  VCHA 2012 Awards Booklet Royal Historical Society of Victoria (Retrieved 21 January 2013)
  VCHA 2013 Awards Booklet Royal Historical Society of Victoria (Retrieved 11 Jul 2014)
 VCHA 2014 Awards Royal Historical Society of Victoria (Retrieved 30 Oct 2014)
 VCHA 2015 Awards Royal Historical Society of Victoria (Retrieved 23 Dec 2015)
 VCHA 2016 Awards Royal Historical Society of Victoria (Retrieved 5 Nov 2016]

Australia history-related lists
Australian non-fiction book awards
History awards